Bryan Lowe (5 November 1925 – 22 October 2015) was an English cricketer. He was a right-handed batsman who played for Cheshire. He was born in Worsley, Salford, Lancashire.

Lowe, who had played with the team in the Minor Counties Championship since 1948, made a single List A appearance for the team, in the 1964 Gillette Cup, against Surrey. From the upper-middle order, he scored a duck.

References

External links
Bryan Lowe at Cricket Archive

1925 births
2015 deaths
English cricketers
Cheshire cricketers
People from Worsley